Alexandr Kogan may refer to:

Aleksandr Kogan (artist) (born 1980), Russian singer and artist
Aleksandr Kogan (politician) (born 1969), Russian politician
Aleksandr Kogan (scientist) (born 1986), data scientist involved in the Cambridge Analytica scandal